Fayette Christian School (FCS) is a private Christian school in Washington Court House, Ohio, for students in preschool through 12th grade. FCS serves Washington Court House, Jeffersonville, and surrounding areas. It is the only Christian school among the three school systems in Fayette County.

Their mascot is the Crusaders. School colors are hunter green, black, and white. FCS holds an annual golf outing as a fundraiser.

History
Fayette Christian School was established in the fall of 1974 as a ministry of the Fayette Bible Church in Washington Court House, Ohio.

Affiliations
FCS is a member of the Buckeye Christian School Organization (BCSO) and participates in athletic tournaments, music festivals, fine arts competitions and elementary competitions through BCSO.
Fayette Christian School is affiliated with and uses the BJU Press curriculum.

Extracurricular activities
Fayette Christian School offers a variety of sports for junior and senior high students including, volleyball, soccer, and basketball, It also offers elementary soccer each fall and elementary basketball in the winter.

The Drama department at FCS presents a play each spring as well as programs in December and May put on by the Kindergarten class, Elementary School and High School.

The Music department offers choir as well as orchestra including brass, woodwinds, percussion and stringed instruments.

References

External links
 Fayette Christian School

Christian schools in Ohio
High schools in Fayette County, Ohio
Private schools in Ohio